Streptomyces yogyakartensis is a bacterium species from the genus of Streptomyces which has been isolated from rhizosphere soil from the tree Paraserianthes falcataria in Yogyakarta on Java on Indonesia.

See also 
 List of Streptomyces species

References

Further reading

External links
Type strain of Streptomyces yogyakartensis at BacDive – the Bacterial Diversity Metadatabase

yogyakartensis
Bacteria described in 2001